Yuri Korneev (March 26, 1937 in Moscow, Soviet Union – June 17, 2002), was a Russian basketball player. At a height of 1.98 m (6'6") tall, he played at the small forward position. He was among the 105 player nominees for the 50 Greatest EuroLeague Contributors list.

Club career
Korneev started his club career with Dynamo Moscow, but he eventually moved to CSKA Moscow, where he became one of the club's cornerstones in the 1960s. While a member of the Red Army club, Korneev won a EuroLeague championship in 1963. He scored 15 crucial points in the tie-breaking final game against Real Madrid, after first two games of the finals were not enough to crown a champion. He made it to the EuroLeague Final once again, two years later, when Real took their revenge for what had been a bitter loss 2 years earlier. In addition to that, Korneev helped CSKA to win five Soviet Union League championships.

Korneev left CSKA in the prime of his career, due to a Soviet rule at the time, that did not allow players above 25 years old to play for the Army-supported team.

Soviet national team
Korneev was a regular member of the senior Soviet national basketball team. Korneev won two EuroBasket gold medals, in 1959 and 1961, two Summer Olympics silver medals, in 1960 and 1964, and a bronze medal at the 1963 FIBA World Championship.

References

External links
Fibaeurope.com profile
Profile at persona.rin.ru

1937 births
2002 deaths
Basketball players at the 1960 Summer Olympics
Basketball players at the 1964 Summer Olympics
Basketball players from Moscow
BC Dynamo Moscow players
FIBA EuroBasket-winning players
Medalists at the 1960 Summer Olympics
Medalists at the 1964 Summer Olympics
Olympic basketball players of the Soviet Union
Olympic silver medalists for the Soviet Union
PBC CSKA Moscow players
Small forwards
Soviet men's basketball players
1959 FIBA World Championship players
1963 FIBA World Championship players
Moscow State Textile University alumni